Heptasulfur imide is the inorganic compound with the formula . It is a pale yellow solid that is, like elemental sulfur, highly soluble in carbon disulfide. The compound, which is only of academic interest, is representative of a family of sulfur imides .

Synthesis and structure
It is prepared by reaction of disulfur dichloride with ammonia, although other methods have been developed.

It is an analogue of octasulfur (cyclooctasulfane) , with one –S– replaced by –N(–H)–. The  center is almost planar, suggesting that the amine is nonbasic.

References

Inorganic amines
Sulfur–nitrogen compounds
Eight-membered rings
Heterocyclic compounds with 1 ring